The House of Representatives is the lower house of Egypt's bicameral parliament.

Formation of the House
The 2014 constitution that was passed in the 2014 constitutional referendum has put into place the following rules: the House that is elected following the ratification of the constitution must have at least 450 members. In addition, prospective members must be Egyptian, must be at least 25 years old and must hold an education certificate. Also, the president can appoint, at the most, five percent of the members in the chamber.

The House sits for a five-year term but can be dissolved earlier by the president. All seats are voted on in each election. The House of Representatives members are elected by absolute majority of legitimate votes cast.

The House may demand the resignation of the cabinet by adopting a motion of censure. For this reason, the Prime Minister of Egypt and his cabinet are necessarily from the dominant party or coalition in the House. When the president and house come from opposing parties (a situation which did arise historically, but not since the 1970s), this would lead to the situation known as cohabitation.

Powers
The House of Representatives has various competences stated in Chapter Five of the Constitution. According to article 86 the House of Representatives shall undertake:

Legislation
Review and approval of agreements and treaties
Review and approval of the State plan and budget
Discussion of the President of the Republic's statement and the government program
Amendments to the Constitution
Approval of declarations of war and emergency

In practice, the People's Assembly had very little power prior to the 2011 Egyptian revolution.  It was dominated by the National Democratic Party, and there was little substantive opposition to executive decisions.

House of Representatives organization

Speaker of the House 

The House of Representatives Speaker (HR Speaker) presides over the House and is elected from the House membership, along with two deputies during the first session of the season. The Speaker's role in session is to keep the peace and order to the parliamentary session, take part in discussion provided that he gives up his presidency to one of his deputies and doesn't return to his presidency until the discussion is finished as well as ordering an emergency session for one of the House' committees. In case of vacancy in the President's office, the Speaker serves as acting president until the presidential elections are held (Which must be within 60 days). This has happened once, when president Anwar Sadat was assassinated in office, and then People's Assembly Speaker, Sufi Abu Taleb served as acting president. The last PA Speaker was Saad Al Katatny, who briefly presided the Assembly for only 5 months from 23 January 2012 to the dissolution of parliament on 18 June 2012.

Speaker's Staff Office 
The Staff is responsible for organization of the house' and its committees' agendas, the enforcement of the House' orders and is the link between the House and different agencies, ministries and other authorities. The staff consists of the HR speaker and his two deputies.

House' General Committee 
This committee is formed in the beginning of the House' annual season, headed by the Speaker. Its membership includes the Deputy Speakers, representatives of the political parties' parliamentary committees, and five House members (of whom one is an independent, if there are more than ten independents). The Speaker is responsible for outlining the committee's agenda. The committee is responsible for discussing the general issues put forward by the president, the prime minister or the speaker.

Specialized Committees 
These 18 committees are:
 Constitutional and Legislation Affairs Committee
 Budget and Planning Committee
 Economical Affairs Committee
 Foreign Relations Committee
 Arab Affairs Committee
 Defense, National Security and Mobilization Committee
 Proposals and Complaints Committee
 Religious, Social and Religious Endowments (Awkaf) Affairs Committee
 Health and Environmental Affairs Committee
 Transportation and Telecommunications Committee
 Housing, Public Utilities and Reconstruction Committee
 Local Government and Public Organizations Committee
 Youth Committee
 Manpower Committee
 Industry and Energy Committee
 Agriculture and Irrigation Committee
 Education and Scientific Research Committee
 Culture, Information and Tourism Committee

Ethics Committee 
This committee is formed in the beginning of the House' annual season, headed by one of the HR speaker deputies. The membership includes the heads of the following committees: Constitutional Affairs and Legislation; Religious, Social and Awkaf Affairs; and Suggestions and Grievances; five members of the General Committee (of whom at least two are from the opposition parties); and five members chosen randomly from the House. This committee is responsible for looking into the violations committed by House members towards the Egyptian society's code of behavior towards religion, social standards, etc.

Ad hoc and combined committees 
The ad hoc committees are formed by the suggestion of the Speaker or the request of the government to study, debate on a new bill or law, voting on the ratification of a new law or bill or a special issue of concern. The Speaker is responsible on choosing members for this committee. The Combined committees are formed by the request of the Speaker, the government, members of two or more of the specialized committees, with the aim of studying a particular issue of concern. These combined committees are headed by one of the Speaker's deputies. The orders of these committees are issued when a majority vote is achieved.

Parliamentary Chapter
The Egyptian House of Representatives is the Egyptian representative of the international parliamentary conventions. This chapter aims at developing of mutual relations with international parliaments. The General Assembly of this chapter consists of the entire membership of the House, and headed by the Speaker. The executive committee of this chapter of the Speaker staff office, three members chosen from the Assembly membership of whom at least one is a member of the opposition parties. The Assembly meets in its chapter form every January. Emergency sessions are held by the request of the executive committee to look into any of additionally outlined issues of concern.

Elections

See also
 Speaker of the House of Representatives (Egypt)
 List of speakers of the House of Representatives (Egypt)

References

External links

 
Parliament of Egypt
Government of Egypt